Pakistani women's cricket team toured Australia in season 2014. The tour consisted of series of 5 One day internationals and 3 Twenty20 internationals. First three of the five ODIs formed a part of the ongoing 2014–16 ICC Women's Championship. Australians won both the series by 5-0 and 3-0.

Squads

ODI series

1st ODI

2nd ODI

3rd ODI

4th ODI

T20I series

1st T20I

2nd T20I

3rd T20I

4th T20I

References

External links 
 Series home at Espncricinfo

Pakistan 2014
2014–16 ICC Women's Championship
Australia 2014
2014–15 Australian women's cricket season
2014 in Pakistani cricket
2014 in women's cricket
2014 in Pakistani women's sport